The Fort Meade Historic District is a U.S. historic district (designated as such on July 29, 1994) located in Fort Meade, Florida. The district is bounded by North 3rd Street, Orange Avenue, South 3rd Street and Sand Mountain Road. It contains 151 historic buildings.

References

External links
 Polk County listings at National Register of Historic Places

National Register of Historic Places in Polk County, Florida
Historic districts on the National Register of Historic Places in Florida
Fort Meade, Florida